Afa'ahiti is a village and district in Tahiti.  It is located on Tahiti-Iti (little Tahiti) close to the Plateau of Taravao, which connects Tahiti-Nui (big Tahiti) to Tahiti-Iti.  The area is rural with many small villages.  The official languages are French and Tahitian.  The currency is the Pacific franc (XPF).  Population as of 2006 was 5,186. Tahiti's west coast freeway runs nearby the commune. The Fa'a'ā International Airport is another way to transport in Afa'ahiti.

Geography

Climate
Afaahiti has a tropical rainforest climate (Köppen climate classification Af).

References

External links
Tahiti Travel Planners

Towns and villages in Tahiti